Elena Bogdan and Renata Voráčová were the defending champions, having won the event in 2012. In 2013, both players decided to defend their titles, but with different partners. Bogdan paired up with Jill Craybas but they lost in the quarterfinals while Voráčová paired up with Mervana Jugić-Salkić.

Jugić-Salkić and Voráčová won the title, defeating Jana Čepelová and Anna Karolína Schmiedlová in the final, 6–1, 6–1.

Seeds

Draw

References 
 Draw

Empire Slovak Open - Doubles